Excoecaria formosana is a species of flowering plant in the family Euphorbiaceae. It was originally described as Excoecaria crenulata var. formosana Hayata. It is native to Nansei-shoto, Japan and Taiwan.

References

formosana
Flora of Japan
Flora of Taiwan